is a private college, located in the city of Kōriyama, Japan.

History
The Koriyama Women's University was established in 1966 as a women's college specializing in home economics. A graduate school was opened in 1992.
The Koriyama Women's Junior College exists on the same site.

Organization

Undergraduate
 School of Home Economics
Department of Food & Nutrition
Department of Human Life 
School of English language

Graduate
Graduate School of Human Life

External links
  Official website 

Educational institutions established in 1966
Private universities and colleges in Japan
Universities and colleges in Fukushima Prefecture
1966 establishments in Japan
Women's universities and colleges in Japan
Kōriyama